Carex cephalotes, also known as wire-head sedge, is a tussock-forming species of perennial sedge in the family Cyperaceae. It is native to south eastern Australia and New Zealand.

Description
The sedge has a densely tufted appearance with many shoots appearing along a short rhizome. The lowest whorl of specialised leaves beneath the inlforecence or involucral bracts is a good deal shorter than the inflorescence itself.

Taxonomy
The species was first formally described by the Australian botanist Ferdinand von Mueller in 1855 as a part of the work Definitions of Rare or Hitherto Undescribed Australian Plants. The only synonym is Carex pyrenaica var. cephalotes.

Distribution
It is found in temperate areas of south eastern Australia from New South Wales down to Tasmania, as well as both the North Island and South Island of New Zealand.
In New South Wales is has a limited distribution in area of alpine herbfields around Mount Kosciuszko.It is only found in small area in southern Victoria, where it is considered critically endangered, in the Highlands and Victorian Alps regions.

See also
List of Carex species

References

cephalotes
Taxa named by Ferdinand von Mueller
Plants described in 1855
Flora of Victoria (Australia)
Flora of New South Wales
Flora of Tasmania
Flora of New Zealand